Clarin-1 is a protein that in humans is encoded by the CLRN1 gene.

Function 

This gene encodes a protein that contains a cytosolic N-terminus, multiple helical transmembrane domains, and an endoplasmic reticulum membrane retention signal, TKGH, in the C-terminus. The encoded protein may be important in development and homeostasis of the inner ear and retina. Mutations within this gene have been associated with Usher syndrome type IIIa. Multiple transcript variants encoding distinct isoforms have been identified for this gene.

References

Further reading

External links
  GeneReviews/NCBI/NIH/UW entry on Retinitis Pigmentosa Overview